The Canton of Combles is a former canton situated in the department of the Somme and in the Picardie region of northern France. It was disbanded following the French canton reorganisation which came into effect in March 2015. It had 4,422 inhabitants (2012).

Geography 
The canton is organised around the commune of Combles in the arrondissement of Péronne. The altitude varies from 42 m (Curlu) à 157 m (Ginchy) for an average of 104m.

The canton comprised 19 communes:

Carnoy
Combles
Curlu
Équancourt
Étricourt-Manancourt
Flers
Ginchy
Gueudecourt
Guillemont
Hardecourt-aux-Bois
Hem-Monacu
Lesbœufs
Longueval
Maricourt
Maurepas
Mesnil-en-Arrouaise
Montauban-de-Picardie
Rancourt
Sailly-Saillisel

Population

See also
 Arrondissements of the Somme department
 Cantons of the Somme department
 Communes of the Somme department

References

Combles
2015 disestablishments in France
States and territories disestablished in 2015